The few pottery exhibits of the Delphi Archaeological Museum include a famous shallow bowl (kylix) with an unusual depiction of the god Apollo. In the white-ground red-figure technique, it was found in a grave underneath the museum.

It is the work of an Attic workshop, around 480–470 BC. Scholars have suggested Euphronios or Onesimos as the painter, or described it as in the manner of the Pistoxenos Painter.  The scene depicted evokes the verse from the second hymn to Apollo found inscribed on the southern wall of the Treasury of the Athenians: "Sing for the gold-haired Pythios who aims far with his bow and arrow and plays nicely the lyre".

Description

Inside the cylix Apollo is depicted with an elaborate hairdo and a laurel wreath on his head, sitting on a chair, the legs of which end up in lion's paws. The god wears a white chiton, a red himation (cloak) and sandals. A seven-stringed lyre is attached to his left hand with a red stripe, whereas with his right hand he pours a libation out of a shallow bowl (patera) decorated with patterns in relief. Opposite the god is a black bird, for which several explanations have been offered: it is identified either as an oracular bird or as a crow which brought to Apollo the message that his beloved Koronis, daughter of king Phlegyas, was getting married.

References

Bibliography
Kolonia, R.,2006, The archaeological museum of Delphi, Athens 
Amandry, P., Chamoux, P., 1991, Guide de Delphes: Le musée, pp. 231–233

External links
Attic white-ground kylix Delphi Archaeological Museum, retrieved February 10, 2016.
www.e-delphi.gr The kylix of Apollo

Individual ancient Greek vases
Collection of the Delphi Archaeological Museum